In physics the term exchange force has been used to describe two distinct concepts which should not be confused.

Exchange of force carriers in particle physics

The preferred meaning of exchange force is in particle physics, where it denotes a force produced by the exchange of force carrier particles, such as the electromagnetic force produced by the exchange of photons between electrons and the strong force produced by the exchange of gluons between quarks.   The idea of an exchange force implies a continual exchange of virtual particles which accompany the interaction and transmit the force, a process that receives its operational justification through the Heisenberg uncertainty principle.

With this notion, one can think about the operation of forces as being analogous to the following situation:
Two people are standing on an ice pond. One person moves their arm and is pushed backwards; a moment later the other person grabs at an invisible object and is driven backwards (repulsed). Even though you cannot see a basketball, you can assume that one person threw a basketball to the other person because you see its effect on the people.
ANIMATION
Another crude analogy which is often used to explain attraction instead of repulsion is two people on an ice pond  throwing boomerangs at each other.  The boomerang is thrown away from the catcher but it circles to the catcher in the thrower's direction, both the thrower and the catcher are impulsed toward each other by the throwing and catching actions.
 
All interactions which affect matter particles can be thought of as involving to an exchange of force carrier particles, a different type of particle altogether, the virtual particle. These particles can be thought of somewhat analogously to basketballs tossed between matter particles (which are like the basketball players). What we normally think of as "forces" are actually the effects of force carrier particles on matter particles.
The basketball animation is, of course, a very crude analogy since it can only explain repulsive forces and gives no hint of how exchanging particles can result in attractive forces. 
We see examples of attractive forces in everyday life (such as magnets and gravity), and so we generally take it for granted that an object's presence can just affect another object. It is when we approach the deeper question, "How can two objects affect one another without touching?" that we propose that the invisible force could be an exchange of force carrier particles. Particle physicists have found that we can explain the force of one particle acting on another to incredible precision by the exchange of these force carrier particles.
One important thing to know about force carriers is that a particular force carrier particle can only be absorbed or produced by a matter particle which is affected by that particular force. For instance, electrons and protons have electric charge, so they can produce and absorb the electromagnetic force carrier, the photon. Neutrinos, on the other hand, have no electric charge, so they cannot absorb or produce photons.

History
One of the earliest uses of the term interaction was in a discussion by Niels Bohr in 1913 of the interaction between the negative electron and the positive nucleus.  Exchange forces were introduced by Werner Heisenberg (1932) and Ettore Majorana (1933) in order to account for the saturation of binding energy and of nuclear density.  This was done in analogy to the quantum mechanical theory of covalent bonds, such as exist between two hydrogen atoms in the hydrogen molecule wherein the chemical force is attractive if the wave function is symmetric under exchange of coordinates of the electrons and is repulsive if the wave function is anti-symmetric in this respect. Additionally, Ernst Stueckelberg developed the vector boson exchange force model as the theoretical explanation of the strong nuclear force in 1935.

Exchange interaction and quantum state symmetry

As another, entirely distinct, meaning of exchange force, it is sometimes used as a synonym for the exchange interaction, between electrons which arises from a combination of the identity of particles, exchange symmetry, and the electrostatic force.

To illustrate the concept of exchange interaction, any two electrons, for example, in the universe are considered indistinguishable particles, and so according to quantum mechanics in 3 dimensions, every particle must behave as a boson or a fermion. In the former case, two (or more) particles can occupy the same quantum state and this results in an exchange interaction between them in the form of attraction; in the latter case, the particles can not occupy the same state according to the Pauli exclusion principle. From quantum field theory, the spin–statistics theorem demands that all particles with half-integer spin behave as fermions and all particles with integer spin behave as bosons. Thus, it so happens that all electrons are fermions, since they have spin 1/2.

As a mathematical consequence, fermions exhibit strong repulsion when their wave functions overlap, but bosons exhibit attraction. This repulsion is what the exchange interaction models. Fermi repulsion results in "stiffness" of fermions. That is why atomic matter, is "stiff" or "rigid" to touch. Where wave functions of electrons overlap, Pauli repulsion takes place. The same is true for protons and neutrons where due to their larger mass, the rigidity of baryons is much larger than that of electrons.

See also 
Exchange symmetry
Fundamental interaction
Holstein–Herring method

References

External links
Exchange Interaction (PDF)
Exchange Interaction and Energy
Exchange Interaction and Exchange Anisotropy 
Particle Adventure

Gauge bosons
Pauli exclusion principle